The Pre-Illinoian Stage is used by Quaternary geologists for the early and middle Pleistocene glacial and interglacial periods of geologic time in North America from ~2.5–0.2 Ma (million years ago).

North America
As the oldest stage in the North American regional subdivision of the Quaternary, the Pre-Illinoian precedes the Illinoian Stage. Researchers have identified 11 distinct glacial stages during the Pre-Illinoian Stage.

The Pleistocene prior to the Illinoian stage had previously been subdivided into the Nebraskan, Aftonian, Kansan, and Yarmouthian stages (ages). However, detailed studies of these stages revealed that the assumptions and criteria on which they were defined proved to be wrong to such a point that these stages became meaningless in terms of the actual glacial–interglacial record.

For example, instead of two glaciations having occurred prior to the Illinoian Stage, researchers found that 11 distinct glaciations had occurred. In addition, what was presumed to have been a single volcanic ash bed, which was used to correlate and differentiate between Kansan and Nebraskan glacial deposits, was found to be three volcanic ash beds of greatly differing ages.  Similarly, paleosols used in the definition of the stages were found to have been greatly miscorrelated, as they consisted of paleosols of greatly differing ages. Because of these and other major problems, the concepts on which the Nebraskan, Aftonian, Kansan, and Yarmouthian (Yarmouth) stages are defined were discredited. North American geologists discarded these stages as unusable and merged them into the Pre-Illinoian Stage.

Great Britain
The Pre-Illinoian stage is contemporary with the Bramertonian, Pre-Pastonian, Pastonian, Beestonian, Cromerian, Anglian,  Hoxnian, and lower most Wolstonian stages of the British Isles combined. The end of the Pre-Illinoian stage has been correlated to the end of Marine Isotope Stage 9 at 300,000 BP. More recent geologic mapping, coring, and optically stimulated luminescence (OSL) dating of Illinoian glacial tills (Glasford Formation) and outwash (Pearl Formation) of the Illinoian Glacial Lobe in North-central Illinois demonstrates that the start of the Illinoian stage and end of the Pre-Illinoian stage correlates with the beginning of Marine Isotope Stage 6 at 191,000 BP.

See also
Ice age
Glacial period
Last glacial period
Timeline of glaciation

References

Further reading
Ehlers, J., and P.L. Gibbard, 2004a, Quaternary Glaciations: Extent and Chronology 2: Part II North America, Elsevier, Amsterdam. 
Gillespie, A.R., S.C. Porter, and B.F. Atwater, 2004, The Quaternary Period in the United States.  Developments in Quaternary Science no. 1. Elsevier, Amsterdam. 
Mangerud, J., J. Ehlers, and P. Gibbard, 2004, Quaternary Glaciations: Extent and Chronology 1: Part I Europe, Elsevier, Amsterdam.  
Sibrava, V., Bowen, D.Q, and Richmond, G.M., eds., 1986, Quaternary Glaciations in the Northern Hemisphere, Quaternary Science Reviews, vol. 5, pp. 1-514.

External links
Aber, J.S., 2006, Regional Glaciation of Kansas and Nebraska,  Emporia State University, Emporia, Kansas.
anonymous, 1997, Glacial Map of North-Central United States,  Work Group on Geospatial Analysis of Glaciated Environments (GAGE), INQUA Commission on Glaciation, Emporia State University, Emporia, Kansas.
anonymous, 2000, Pre-Wisconsin Glaciation of Central North America, Work Group on Geospatial Analysis of Glaciated Environments (GAGE), INQUA Commission on Glaciation, Emporia State University, Emporia, Kansas.
anonymous, 2007, Global correlation tables for the Quaternary, Subcommission on Quaternary Stratigraphy, Department of Geography, University of Cambridge, Cambridge, England
Hallberg, G.R., ed., 1980a, Pleistocene stratigraphy in east-central Iowa, PDF version 15.6 MB. Technical information Series. no. 10. Iowa Geological Survey Bureau, Ames, IA. 
Hallberg, G. R., ed., 1980b, Illinoian and Pre-Illinoian stratigraphy of southeast Iowa and adjacent Illinois, PDF version 19.3 MB. Technical information Series. no. 11. Iowa Geological Survey Bureau, Ames, IA. 
Hallberg, G. R., T. E. Fenton, T. J. Kemmis, and G. A.  Miller, 1980, Yarmouth Revisited: Midwest Friends of  the Pleistocene 27th Field Conference., PDF version 4.6 MB. Guidebook no. 3.  Iowa Geological Survey Bureau, Ames, IA.

Glaciology of the United States
Ice ages
Middle Pleistocene
Pleistocene geochronology
Pleistocene North America
Pleistocene United States
Geology of Illinois
Interglacials